Scott Joel Aaronson (born May 21, 1981) is an American theoretical computer scientist and   David J. Bruton Jr. Centennial Professor of Computer Science at the University of Texas at Austin. His primary areas of research are quantum computing and computational complexity theory.

Early life and education
Aaronson grew up in the United States, though he spent a year in Asia when his father—a science writer turned public-relations executive—was posted to Hong Kong. He enrolled in a school there that permitted him to skip ahead several years in math, but upon returning to the US, he found his education restrictive, getting bad grades and having run-ins with teachers. He enrolled in The Clarkson School, a gifted education program run by Clarkson University, which enabled Aaronson to apply for colleges while only in his freshman year of high school. He was accepted into Cornell University, where he obtained his BSc in computer science in 2000, and where he resided at the Telluride House. He then attended the University of California, Berkeley, for his PhD, which he got in 2004 under the supervision of Umesh Vazirani.

Aaronson had shown ability in mathematics from an early age, teaching himself calculus at the age of 11, provoked by symbols in a babysitter's textbook. He discovered computer programming at age 11, and felt he lagged behind peers, who had already been coding for years. In part due to Aaronson getting into advanced mathematics before getting into computer programming, he felt drawn to theoretical computing, particularly computational complexity theory. At Cornell, he became interested in quantum computing and devoted himself to computational complexity and quantum computing.

Career
After postdoctorates at the Institute for Advanced Study and the University of Waterloo, he took a faculty position at MIT in 2007.  His primary area of research is quantum computing and computational complexity theory more generally.

In the summer of 2016 he moved from MIT to the University of Texas at Austin as David J. Bruton Jr. Centennial Professor of Computer Science and as the founding director of UT Austin's new Quantum Information Center. In summer 2022 he announced he would be working for a year at OpenAI on theoretical foundations of AI safety.

Awards
 Aaronson is one of two winners of the 2012 Alan T. Waterman Award.
 Best Student Paper Awards at the Computational Complexity Conference for the papers "Limitations of Quantum Advice and One-Way Communication" (2004)  and "Quantum Certificate Complexity" (2003).
 Danny Lewin Best Student Paper Award at the Symposium on Theory of Computing for the paper "Lower Bounds for Local Search by Quantum Arguments" (2004).
 2009 Presidential Early Career Award for Scientists and Engineers
 2017 Simons Investigator
 He was elected as an ACM Fellow in 2019 "for contributions to quantum computing and computational complexity".
 He was awarded the 2020 ACM Prize in Computing "for groundbreaking contributions to quantum computing".

Popular work
He is a founder of the Complexity Zoo wiki, which catalogs all classes of computational complexity. He is the author of the much-read blog "Shtetl-Optimized". 

In the interview to Scientific American he answers why his blog is called shtetl-optimized, and about his preoccupation to the past:

He also wrote the essay "Who Can Name The Bigger Number?". The latter work, widely distributed in academic computer science, uses the concept of Busy Beaver Numbers as described by Tibor Radó to illustrate the limits of computability in a pedagogic environment.

He has also taught a graduate-level survey course, "Quantum Computing Since Democritus", for which notes are available online, and have been published as a book by Cambridge University Press.  It weaves together disparate topics into a cohesive whole, including quantum mechanics, complexity, free will, time travel, the anthropic principle and more. Many of these interdisciplinary applications of computational complexity were later fleshed out in his article, "Why Philosophers Should Care About Computational Complexity".  Since then, Aaronson published a book entitled Quantum Computing Since Democritus based on the course.

An article of Aaronson's, "The Limits of Quantum Computers", was published in Scientific American, and he was a guest speaker at the 2007 Foundational Questions in Science Institute conference. Aaronson is frequently cited in the non-academic press, such as Science News, The Age, ZDNet, Slashdot, New Scientist, The New York Times, and Forbes magazine.

Alleged Love Communications plagiarism
Aaronson was the subject of media attention in October 2007, when he accused Love Communications, a Sydney-based advertising agency, of plagiarizing a lecture he wrote on quantum mechanics in an advertisement of theirs.  He alleged that a commercial they made for Ricoh Australia appropriated content almost verbatim from the lecture. Aaronson received an email from the agency claiming to have sought legal advice and saying they did not believe that they were in violation of his copyright.

Dissatisfied, Aaronson pursued the matter, and the agency settled the dispute without admitting wrongdoing by making a charitable contribution to two science organizations of his choice.  Concerning this matter, Aaronson stated, "Someone suggested [on my blog] a cameo with the models but if it was between that and a free printer, I think I'd take the printer."

Personal life
Aaronson is married to computer scientist Dana Moshkovitz.

References

External links

Aaronson's blog
Aaronson homepage
UT Austin Quantum Information Center homepage

American people of Jewish descent
Jewish scientists
Cornell University alumni
UC Berkeley College of Engineering alumni
MIT School of Engineering faculty
Institute for Advanced Study visiting scholars
Theoretical computer scientists
Science bloggers
1981 births
Living people
American expatriates in Hong Kong
Simons Investigator
University of Texas at Austin faculty
Quantum information scientists
Fellows of the Association for Computing Machinery
Recipients of the Presidential Early Career Award for Scientists and Engineers